The women's high jump event was part of the track and field athletics programme at the 1948 Summer Olympics. The competition was held on August 7, 1948.  The final was won by Alice Coachman of the United States.

Records
Prior to the competition, the existing World and Olympic records were as follows.

The following new Olympic record was set during this competition:

Schedule

All times are British Summer Time (UTC+1)

Results

Key:  OR = Olympic record

References

Sources
Organising Committee for the XIV Olympiad, The (1948). The Official Report of the Organising Committee for the XIV Olympiad. LA84 Foundation. Retrieved 7 September 2016.

Athletics at the 1948 Summer Olympics
High jump at the Olympics
1948 in women's athletics
Ath